David Stephen "Dai" Llewellyn (born 29 September 1970) is a former Wales international rugby union player. He played his club rugby for Ebbw Vale, Newport and Neath and was part of the Wales squad for the 1999 World Cup where he scored a try.

Llewellyn won four caps for Wales between 1998 and 1999. He featured a further twelve times on the bench for his country. Llewellyn played in the last Five Nations tournament and made one appearance in the 1999 Rugby World Cup as a replacement against Japan.

Notes

1970 births
Living people
Barbarian F.C. players
Ebbw Vale RFC players
Neath RFC players
Newport RFC players
Plymouth Albion R.F.C. players
Rugby union players from Bedwellty
Wales international rugby union players
Welsh rugby union players
Rugby union scrum-halves